Microlamia viridis is a species of beetle in the family Cerambycidae. It was described by Slipinski & Escalona in 2013.

References

Acanthocinini
Beetles described in 2013